The 2001 Dallas Burn season was the sixth season of the Major League Soccer team. The team made the playoffs for the sixth consecutive year. Due to the September 11 attacks, the final two games of the season were cancelled. It was the first season under new head coach Mike Jeffries. The season was full of highs and lows. The team set the franchise record for highest attended playoff game on September 23, a record which still stands. The team also had their worst run in the U.S. Open Cup in franchise history, losing to the Seattle Sounders in overtime of the second round.

Final standings

Regular season

Playoffs

Quarterfinals

U.S. Open Cup

References

External links
 Season statistics

2001
Dallas Burn
Dallas Burn
Dallas Burn